A salute state was a princely state under the British Raj that had been granted a gun salute by the British Crown (as paramount ruler); i.e., the protocolary privilege for its ruler to be greeted—originally by Royal Navy ships, later also on land—with a number of cannon shots, in graduations of two salutes from three to 21, as recognition of the state's relative status. The gun-salute system of recognition was first instituted during the time of the East India Company in the late 18th century and was continued under direct Crown rule from 1858.

As with the other princely states, the salute states varied greatly in size and importance. The states of Hyderabad and Jammu and Kashmir, both with a 21-gun salute, were each over 200,000 km2 in size, or slightly larger than the whole of Great Britain; in 1941, Hyderabad had a population of over 16,000,000, comparable to the population of Romania at the time, while Jammu and Kashmir had a population of slightly over 4 million, comparable to that of Switzerland. At the other end of the scale, Janjira and Sachin (11 and 9 guns, respectively, and both ruled by branches of the same dynasty) were respectively 137 km2 and 127 km2 in size, or slightly larger than the island of Jersey; in 1941, Janjira had a population of nearly 14,000, the smallest of the salute states on the subcontinent.

For varying periods of time, a number of salute states in South Asia (Afghanistan), on the Indian subcontinent (Nepal, Bhutan, Sikkim) or in the Middle East (the Gulf/Trucial States and various states in the Aden Protectorate) were also under the British Raj as protectorates or protected states. As with the Indian principalities, those states received varying numbers of gun salutes and varied tremendously in terms of autonomy. Afghanistan and Nepal were both British protected states from the 19th century until 1921 and 1923, respectively, after which they were sovereign nations in direct relations with the British Foreign Office; while protected states, both enjoyed autonomy in internal affairs, though control of foreign affairs was left to the British. The states under the Persian Gulf Residency and the Aden Protectorate (part of the Bombay Presidency until 1937) ranged from Oman, a 21-gun-rated sultanate under a limited protectorate, to the 3-gun Trucial States which were near-total protectorates.

Following their independence in 1947, the new Indian and Pakistani governments maintained the gun-salute system until 1971 (in India) and 1972 (in Pakistan), when the former ruling families were officially derecognised. The Aden Protectorate was transferred to the control of the British Foreign Office in 1937 and eventually became the independent state of South Yemen in 1967, resulting in the abolition of its salute states the same year. Just prior to Indian independence in 1947, the Persian Gulf Residency was likewise transferred to Foreign Office control, remaining in existence until the Trucial States became fully independent in December 1971, forming the United Arab Emirates (UAE) in early 1972.

Salute states and equivalents
When the ruler of a princely state arrived at the Indian capital (originally at Calcutta (Kolkata), then at Delhi), he was greeted with a number of gun-firings. The number of these consecutive "gun salutes" changed from time to time, be increased or reduced depending on the degree of honour which the British chose to accord to a given ruler. The number of gun salutes accorded to a ruler was usually a reflection of the state of his relations with the British and/or his perceived degree of political power; a 21-gun salute was considered the highest. The King (or Queen) of the United Kingdom (who until 1948 was also the Emperor of India) was accorded a 101-gun salute, and 31 guns were used to salute the Viceroy of India.

The number of guns in a salute assumed particular importance at the time of holding of the Coronation Durbar in Delhi in the month of December 1911. The Durbar was held to commemorate the Coronation of King George V with guns firing almost all day. At that time there were three Princely States that were given 21 gun salutes. These were:

The Maharaja Gaekwad of Baroda State
The Maharaja of Mysore
The Nizam of Hyderabad

In 1917, the Maharaja Scindia of Gwalior was upgraded to a permanent and hereditary 21-gun salute, and the Maharaja of Jammu and Kashmir was granted the same in 1921. Both were granted the increased ranks as a result of the meritorious services of their soldiers in the First World War.

Apart from these, no other Princely State received a 21-gun salute. Three of the most prominent princes, however, enjoyed a local salute of 21 guns within the limits of their own state and 19 guns in the rest of India. They were the Nawab (Begum) of Bhopal, the Maharaja Holkar of Indore and the Maharana of Udaipur.

The Nizam, Maharajas, Princes, etc. were all deeply keen on protocol and ensured that it was practised as a matter of faith. Any departure from it was not taken kindly by them. Salute of guns was one such protocol that was strictly followed.

Classifications and sub-classifications of salute states
At the time of Indian independence and partition in 1947, 118 (113 in India, 4 in Pakistan, plus Sikkim) of the roughly 565 princely states were classified as "salute states." 
 The rulers of the five premier states - Hyderabad State, Mysore, Baroda, Jammu & Kashmir, and Gwalior - received 21-gun salutes.
 The rulers of six others - Bhopal, Indore, Udaipur, Kolhapur, Travancore, and Kalat - received 19-gun salutes, with Bhopal, Indore and Udaipur entitled to a local 21-gun salute.
 77 were entitled to gun salutes ranging from 17 to 11 guns, with additional gun-salutes granted on a local or personal basis.
 The remaining 30 received a salute of nine guns.
 88 rulers with gun salutes of 11 guns or above, whether the salute was hereditary or local only, were entitled to the style of Highness. 
 In 1918, the Nizam of Hyderabad was granted the unique style of Exalted Highness, in recognition of the state's contributions to the Allied war effort during the First World War. 
 In 1948, all rulers of nine-gun salute states were also granted the style of Highness.

The salute states were broadly divided into two categories: the five premier states with a permanent 21-gun salute and with an individual resident, or envoy, stationed in each, and the remaining 113 states incorporated within political agencies (groups of states) under a political agent. The salutes were themselves organised in a strict hierarchy. Each ruling house of a salute state was entitled to a permanent hereditary salute. In some instances, one of three sub-categories consisting of an increase of 2 gun salutes could be awarded as follows:
Personal and local: Hereditary to an individual state's ruler only within its borders, and personally to the ruler outside his state, but honouring his person and not the state when he was outside it. An award of a personal salute was only for the lifetime of the ruler, and was typically made for distinguished wartime or civic service.
Personal: Only for the ruler personally, and not to distinguish his state as a whole.
Local: Hereditary to an individual state's ruler only within its borders.

As a religious head, the Aga Khan received a personal 11-gun salute. In certain cases, a ruler of a non-salute state or a junior member of a princely family could merit a personal salute or the personal style of Highness.

Salutes within the Indian Empire (royals, administrators, and officers, as of 1947)

Salute states that acceded to India

At independence in 1947, the gun salutes enjoyed by the 113 states that acceded to the Union of India were as follows:

The system of gun salutes continued in the Republic of India until 1971.

Although salutes with many more guns have been used for Western Monarchs (and dynastic and other associated occasions), the 21-gun salute has in modern times become customary for Sovereign Monarchs (hence also known as 'royal salute') and republic.

Some of the rulers not listed above were granted increased gun salutes after the independence, e.g. the Maharana of Mewar (at Udaipur, Maharajpramukh in Rajasthan) was raised to first place in the Order of Precedence, displacing the Nizam of Hyderabad and Berar, and all 9-gun states were permitted the use of the style of Highness. However, it has not been possible to obtain complete details for all the rulers.

This system continued till 1971 when privileges and Privy Purses of ex-rulers were abolished by the Government of India.

Salute states that acceded to Pakistan

Between August 1947 and March 1948, thirteen Muslim princely states in western India acceded to the new Dominion of Pakistan, created from British India by the Indian Independence Act 1947, thus becoming the Princely states of Pakistan. Between 1955 and 1974, they were all amalgamated into larger federations and provinces. All of the princely states were in the western part of the country, so all were merged into the eventual West Pakistan, which constitutes (since the breakaway of Bangla Desh) the present-day Republic of Pakistan.
 
The states retained internal autonomy so long as they existed, but all had lost this by 1974. The styles and titles enjoyed by the former ruling families ceased to be officially recognised by the Government of Pakistan, mostly in January 1972, with the exception of the small states of Hunza and Nagar, which were shortly after incorporated into the Northern Areas of Pakistan in October 1974.

Four salute states acceded to Pakistan between 3 October 1947 and 27 March 1948. In order of precedence, they were as follows:

After several promotions and two further post-colonial awarding under the republic – which India didn't do – the gun salutes enjoyed by the states in Pakistan were as follows in 1966:

 Hereditary salute of 19-guns (promoted): the Amir of Bahawalpur
 Hereditary salute of 19-guns: the Khan of Kalat
 Hereditary salute of 17-guns (promoted): the Mir of Khairpur
 Hereditary salute of 15-guns: the Mir of Hunza (granted by President Ayub Khan in 1966, previously non-salute)
 Hereditary salute of 15-guns: the Wali of Swat (granted by President Ayub Khan in 1966, previously non-salute)
 Hereditary salute of 11-guns: the Mehtar of Chitral

Salute states in Burma
9 guns (permanent, for rulers of the following Shan States):
The Saopha of Kengtung
The Saopha of Hsipaw
The Saopha of Mong Nai
The Saopha of Yawnghwe

Protectorates and protected states under the Indian Empire
The following list of gun salutes is as they stood in 1947.

South Asia

British protected state; subsequently a sovereign monarchy (Afghanistan and Nepal)

In 1890, Abdur Rahman Khan, the Emir of Afghanistan, accepted for his kingdom the status of a British protected state under the British Raj, retaining internal autonomy while placing the state's foreign affairs under British control. In 1905, his son and successor, Habibullah Khan, negotiated the Anglo-Afghan Treaty with the British, by which Afghanistan was de jure styled as a sovereign monarchy and the ruler recognised as King of Afghanistan (Shah-e-Afghanistan) with the style of His Majesty, while remaining a protected state of Britain. In May 1919, King Habibullah's successor, King Amanullah, declared the country a wholly sovereign kingdom, which resulted in the Third Anglo-Afghan War. Despite a British victory, the British recognised the total sovereignty of Afghanistan in the Anglo-Afghan Treaty of Kabul in 1921; thereafter, Afghanistan continued to exist as a sovereign monarchy until the fall of the monarchy in 1973.

The Anglo-Nepalese War of 1816, which led to the defeat of the Gorkha Shah monarchy of Nepal, resulted in the kingdom becoming a de jure protectorate, but a de facto protected state of the East India Company. Following the Indian Rebellion of 1857 and the dissolution of the East India Company in 1858, the protectorate was transferred to the British crown through the British Raj, which recognised the monarch as "King of Nepal" with the style of His Majesty in 1919 and the Rana Maharaja was styled as His Highness, due to the country's contributions to the Allied cause in the First World War. In 1923, the British government ended its protectorate and recognised Nepal as a wholly sovereign monarchy. While the semi-sovereign Rana oligarchy held power as hereditary Shree Teen Maharajas of Nepal until its deposition in 1951, the Nepalese monarchy continued until its abolition in 2008.

De jure sovereign, but de facto British protected state; retained status in relation to India (Bhutan)

A brief war between Bhutan and the British Raj in 1864 resulted in the Treaty of Sinchula, which forced Bhutan to relinquish territory and defined its relationship with the British. A loose agglomeration of semi-independent districts until 1907, Bhutan was unified in that year as a hereditary monarchy represented by Ugyen Wangchuck, the penlop (or governor) of the district of Tongsa, who was proclaimed the Maharaja and Druk Gyalpo (Dragon King) of Bhutan.  In 1910, Bhutan signed the Treaty of Punakha, under which the British Raj guaranteed Bhutan's internal sovereignty, but, as with Sikkim, maintained control over its foreign relations. A British residency was officially installed in Bhutan, with a resident deputed from the Indian Political Service and answerable to the British government in India. The treaty, which established Bhutanese sovereignty, albeit as a protected state, remained in force until Indian independence in 1947; at this time, Bhutan was offered the options of remaining independent or acceding to the new Indian Union. Choosing to maintain its independence, Bhutan formally established relations with India in 1949, signing the India-Bhutan Treaty of Friendship on 8 August 1949; while reaffirming Bhutanese sovereignty, the new treaty gave India control over Bhutan's foreign policy. In 1963, however, Bhutan promulgated a new constitution which replaced the title of His Highness the Maharaja with His Majesty the Druk Gyalpo, formally promoting the country to the status of an independent, sovereign monarchy. In 1971, Bhutan joined the United Nations as a full member, and renegotiated the 1949 treaty with India in 2007, legally ending Bhutan's status as a protected state of India.

British protectorate; subsequently an Indian protectorate and state  (Sikkim)

Though officially considered a princely state under its ruler, the Maharaja Chogyal, Sikkim was given the separate status of a British protectorate in 1861 under the Treaty of Tumlong, by which the British government could intervene in the state's internal affairs and oversee all external matters; despite this, Sikkim maintained a high degree of autonomy in practice. In 1947, the Maharaja Chogyal and his people decided against accession to India and chose to maintain Sikkim's internal sovereignty. The state formally became a protectorate of India in 1950. Following the death of the Maharaja Chogyal in 1963 and his succession by his unpopular son, Palden Thondup Namgyal, popular demands for increased individual rights grew more frequent. After Sikkim's first free general elections in 1974, the Indian Army placed the Chogyal under house arrest. Under military supervision, a controversial referendum was held in 1975, which approved the state's merger with India and the abolition of the monarchy. Sikkim was formally merged into India as its 22nd state on 
26 April 1975.

Middle East and Persian Gulf

Middle East Protectorates - Aden Protectorate (until 1917)
The following were constituent states of the Aden Protectorate from the late 19th century until their independence and merger with South Yemen in 1967 when the states were abolished. The protectorate was under the British Raj and governed as part of the Bombay Presidency until 1917 when the protectorate was transferred to the control of the British Foreign Office.

Middle East Protectorates - Persian Gulf Residency
The Persian Gulf Residency was established in 1822 during the time of the East India Company, though the company had established a residency at Bushehr in 1763. It was made subordinate to the Governor of Bombay until 1873. As with the rest of British India, it came under the control of the British Crown in 1858. In 1873, the residency came under the direct control of the British Raj and the India Office. In 1892, it officially assumed a protectorate status over the states of Muscat and Oman, Bahrain and the Trucial States, followed by Kuwait in 1914 and Qatar in 1916. In 1920, the Treaty of Seeb recognised the de jure independence of Oman. The residency was transferred to the charge of the British Foreign Office from the India Office in 1947, shortly before Indian independence. In 1961, Kuwait became the first of the Gulf States to terminate its protectorate and become fully independent, with Muscat and Oman being recognised by Britain as an independent, protected state the following year. With the increasing costs of maintaining an overseas presence, Britain announced in January 1968 that it would end its protectorate over the remaining Gulf states in 1971. The protectorates were finally terminated in December 1971; Muscat and Oman became the modern sultanate of Oman that year, and the erstwhile Trucial States became the United Arab Emirates in 1972.

Personal salute dynasties on the Indian subcontinent

Rulers of princely states (in 1947)
9 guns: Padam Singh, Raja of Bashahr (now in Himachal Pradesh)

Religious leaders
11 guns: the Aga Khan (religious leader of the Nizari Ismaili branch of Islam); only salute not attached to any territorial principality).

Political pensioners under the British Raj
19 guns (only personal and local) for the Nawab of Murshidabad, as heirs of Bengal (including present Bangladesh and West Bengal)
15 guns (until 1899) for the Nawab (later restyled Prince) of Arcot, i.e. the Carnatic
13 guns salute for Raja of Vizianagram

Zamindars in French India
4 guns: Manyam Zamindar of Yanam

States within the British sphere of influence (as of 1947)

Sovereign foreign rulers
19 guns: The Dalai lama of Tibet, a de facto sovereign theocratic Buddhist nation before annexation by the People's Republic of China
21 guns: The King of Mosquito Coast (a Native South American kingdom in present Nicaragua; styled His Majesty, most unusual as HM is normally reserved for the Paramount Ruler and his or her independent peers; under British protectorate since 1688, formalised in 1749 with appointment of a resident Superintendent; Britain relinquished control in 1783–87; Nicaraguan sovereignty was recognised in 1860 under the Treaty of Managua, hence the king was effectively demoted to the rank of a mere "chief", in 1894 militarily driven into exile to Jamaica)
9 guns: The Kabaka of Buganda (a Ganda kingdom in Western Uganda, status granted after 1912, subsequently made permanent in 1939)

See also 
 List of Indian monarchs
 List of Maratha dynasties and states
 List of princely states of British India (alphabetical)
 List of Rajput dynasties and states
 Maratha Empire
 Maratha titles
 Prince and Principality for information on princely styles worldwide
 Princely state
 Rajputana

Notes

References 

Governance of the British Empire
India
Monarchy
Princely states of India